Eddie Henderson may refer to:

 Eddie Henderson (soccer) (born 1967), American soccer player
 Eddie Henderson (musician) (born 1940), American jazz trumpet and flugelhorn player